The London Mills Bridge was one of nine metal highway bridges in Fulton County, Illinois listed on the National Register of Historic Places. This particular one was located along County Highway 39 as it spans the Spoon River on the north side of London Mills. It was added to the National Register of Historic Places on October 29, 1980, along with the eight other bridges, as one of the "Metal Highway Bridges of Fulton County". Some of the other bridges included London Mill's only other Registered Historic Place, the Indian Ford Bridge.

London Mills Bridge and Indian Ford Bridge have both been demolished since their inclusion on the National Register of Historic Places.

See also
List of bridges documented by the Historic American Engineering Record in Illinois

Notes

External links

Road bridges on the National Register of Historic Places in Illinois
Bridges in Fulton County, Illinois
Demolished bridges in the United States
Bridges completed in 1917
Historic American Engineering Record in Illinois
National Register of Historic Places in Fulton County, Illinois
Metal bridges in the United States
Truss bridges in the United States